Weaver is a surname.

Geographical Distribution
At the time of the United Kingdom Census of 1881, the frequency of the surname Weaver was highest in the following counties:

 1. Herefordshire (1: 328)
 2. Worcestershire (1: 531)
 3. Shropshire (1: 677)
 4. Montgomeryshire (1: 875)
 5. Somerset (1: 881)
 6. Staffordshire (1: 990)
 7. Radnorshire (1: 1,053)
 8. Gloucestershire (1: 1,055)
 9. Cheshire (1: 2,111)
 10. Denbighshire (1: 2,191)

As of 2014, the frequency of the surname was highest in the following countries and territories:

 1. United States (1: 2,102)
 2. Antigua and Barbuda (1: 2,105)
 3. Wales (1: 3,813)
 4. England (1: 4,658)
 5. New Zealand (1: 4,731)
 6. Cayman Islands (1: 5,041)
 7. United States Virgin Islands (1: 5,911)
 8. Saint Pierre and Miquelon (1: 6,081)
 9. Australia (1: 6,952)
 10. Canada (1: 8,207)

As of 2014, 85.5% of all known bearers of the surname Weaver were residents of the United States. The frequency of the surname was higher than national average in the following U.S. states:

 1. Pennsylvania (1: 815)
 2. Alabama (1: 1,017)
 3. Georgia (1: 1,033)
 4. Indiana (1: 1,157)
 5. West Virginia (1: 1,163)
 6. Ohio (1: 1,196)
 7. Arkansas (1: 1,252)
 8. Oklahoma (1: 1,328)
 9. Tennessee (1: 1,343)
 10. North Carolina (1: 1,449)
 11. Virginia (1: 1,580)
 12. Alaska (1: 1,605)
 13. Idaho (1: 1,675)
 14. South Carolina (1: 1,701)
 15. Maryland (1: 1,834)
 16. Montana (1: 1,842)
 17. Mississippi (1: 1,854)
 18. Kansas (1: 1,867)
 19. Missouri (1: 1,880)
 20. Oregon (1: 1,899)
 21. Delaware (1: 1,918)
 22. Utah (1: 1,949)
 23. Colorado (1: 1,995)
 24. Kentucky (1: 2,003)
 25. Wyoming (1: 2,016)
 26. Texas (1: 2,039)
 27. Michigan (1: 2,062)
 28. D.C. (1: 2,062)

As of 2014, the frequency of the surname was highest (over 10 times the national average) in the following U.S. counties:

 1. Washington County, Ala. (1: 79)
 2. Holmes County, Ohio (1: 101)
 3. Petroleum County, Mont. (1: 101)
 4. Granite County, Mont. (1: 121)
 5. Gilmer County, Ga. (1: 126)
 6. Clinton County, Pa. (1: 129)
 7. Lancaster County, Pa. (1: 157)
 8. Madison County, Va. (1: 159)
 9. Ashe County, N.C. (1: 162)
 10. Taylor County, W.Va. (1: 166)
 11. Murray County, Ga. (1: 171)
 12. Macon County, Ga. (1: 195)
 13. Marion County, Ga. (1: 196)
 14. Screven County, Ga. (1: 198)
 15. Talbot County, Ga. (1: 202)
 16. Edwards County, Texas (1: 209)
 17. Mifflin County, Pa. (1: 210)

People
Notable people with the surname include:

Al Weaver (born 1981), British stage actor
Amos Weaver (1869–1937), Philippine–American War Medal of Honor recipient
Blayne Weaver (born 1976), US actor
Buck Weaver (1890–1956), US baseball player
Claude Weaver (1867–1954), American politician
Claude Weaver III (1923–1944), American-Canadian World War II flying ace
Clement Weaver (1620–1683), member of House of Deputies, Colony of Rhode Island, 1678
Curtis Weaver (born 1998), American football player
Dennis Weaver (1924–2006), American actor
Doodles Weaver (1911–1983), American comic and actor; brother of Pat, uncle of Sigourney
Earl Weaver (1930–2013), American baseball manager
Edmund Weaver (astronomer) (1683–1748), astronomer
Edmund Weaver (MP) (1610-1672), English politician
Evan Weaver (born 1998), American football player
Fawn Weaver, author, entrepreneur, and historian
George Weaver (disambiguation), multiple people
Henry A. Weaver (1820–1890), American politician from Pennsylvania
Henry Grady Weaver (1889–1949), author of The Mainspring of Human Progress, General Motors executive
Iva Bigelow Weaver (1875-1932), American singer
Jacki Weaver, Australian actress
James Weaver (disambiguation), multiple people
Jered Weaver (born 1982), American baseball player
Jeff Weaver (born 1976), American baseball player
Joe Weaver (1934–2006), American blues and R&B pianist, singer and bandleader
John Weaver (disambiguation), multiple people
Kaitlyn Weaver (born 1989), American-Canadian ice dancer
Larrye Weaver (born 1931), American football player and coach
Leonard Weaver, American football player
Louise Weaver (born 1966), Australian artist
Luke Weaver (baseball) (born 1993), American baseball player
Marjorie Weaver (1913–1994), American actress
Michael Weaver (disambiguation), several people
Mike Weaver (boxer) (born 1952), boxer
Mike Weaver (ice hockey) (born 1978), American ice hockey player
Nicky Weaver (born 1979), English footballer
Sylvester "Pat" Weaver (1908–2002), American television executive, father of Sigourney, brother of Doodles
Patty Weaver (born 1955), American actress
Pauline Weaver (1797–1867), mountain man, trapper, prospector, scout for the Mormon Battalion and Civil War armies
Rashad Weaver (born 1997), American football player
Richard C. Weaver, better known as the "Handshake Man"
Richard M. Weaver (1910–1963), American scholar and author
Richard Weaver (MP) (1575–1642), English politician
Robert C. Weaver (1907–1997), first US Secretary of Housing and Urban Development and first African-American to hold cabinet-level position
Robert Weaver (MP) (1630-1687), English politician
Sam Weaver (1909–1985), English footballer
Sam Weaver (baseball) (1855–1914), American baseball player
Sigourney Weaver (born 1949), American actress, daughter of Pat Weaver, niece of Doodles
Stanley B. Weaver (1925–2003), American politician and funeral director
Warren Weaver (1894–1978), mathematician and author of Weaver's memorandum for machine translation
William Weaver (1923–2013), translator
Will Weaver (basketball), American basketball coach

See also
Weaver W. Adams (1901–1963), American chess master, author, and opening theoretician
Weaver Hawkins (1893–1977), English painter and printmaker
Weaver Levy (1925–2018), Chinese American character actor

References

English-language surnames